The Presidium of the Supreme Soviet was a body of state power in the Union of Soviet Socialist Republics (USSR). The presidium was elected by joint session of both houses of the Supreme Soviet to act on its behalf while the Supreme Soviet was not in session. By the 1936 and 1977 Soviet Constitution, the Presidium of the Supreme Soviet served as the collective head of state of the USSR. In all its activities, the Presidium was accountable to the Supreme Soviet of the USSR.

Beside the all-Union body they were also in all union republics (eg: Presidium of the Supreme Soviet of the Russian SFSR, Presidium of the Ukrainian SSR, etc.) and other regions including autonomous republics. Structure and functions of the presidiums in these republics were virtually identical.

During discussions in regard to adaptation of the 1936 Constitution of the Soviet Union, on proposition to elect the chairman of the Presidium in a nationwide election, Stalin argued:

Election

The Presidium of the Supreme Soviet was elected by the Supreme Soviet of the USSR at a joint session of both chambers at the first session of each after convocation. The deputies of the Presidium were appointed for the duration of the term of office of the Supreme Soviet. The Presidium of the Supreme Soviet of the USSR consisted of a chairman, a first vice-chairman (after 1977), his 15 deputies (one from each republic), a secretary, and 20 members. The Presidium was accountable to the Supreme Soviet of the USSR for all its activities.

From 1938 to 1989, the chairman of the Presidium was reckoned as the USSR/Soviet Union's de jure head of state and was sometimes referred to as the "President of the USSR/Soviet Union" in non-Soviet sources.

The building of the Presidium
Its building, situated inside the Moscow Kremlin, was appropriately named the Kremlin Presidium.

Constitutional powers

At inception
According to the 1936 Constitution of the USSR, as in force as enacted originally (and thus, at the establishment of the Presidium), the basic powers of the Presidium of the Supreme Soviet of the USSR were:

promulgation of decrees (ukases);
interpretation of current Soviet laws;
dissolution of the Supreme Soviet of the USSR on the basis of Article 47 of the 1936 Constitution of the USSR and scheduling new elections: implementing a national referendum on its own initiative or at the request of one of the republics of the Union.
abrogation of decrees, issued by the Council of Ministers and Council of Ministers of the republics of the Union in case there is a discrepancy with the law;
relieving the Chairman of the Council of Ministers of his job and appointing Ministers of the USSR (between sessions of the Supreme Soviet) with the subsequent submittal for the Supreme Soviet's approval;
establishment of orders and medals of the USSR and implementing the awarding procedures.
establishment of honorary titles of the USSR and their assignment.
realization of the right to pardon;
appointment and dismissal of the executive command of the Soviet Armed Forces;
establishment of military and diplomatic ranks and other special ranks;
declaration of the general and partial mobilization;
declaration of war in case of an attack on the USSR or in case when it was necessary to implement obligations of international mutual defense treaties;
ratification and denunciation of international treaties, signed by the USSR;
representation of the Supreme Soviet of the USSR (between its sessions) in its relations with parliaments of foreign countries;
appointment and dismissal of Soviet plenipotentiaries in foreign countries;
receiving of Letters of Credence and Letters of Recall from foreign diplomatic representatives, accredited in the USSR;
declaration of the martial law in a given region or across the USSR in the interest of defending the USSR or preserving public order and state security.

The presidium also dealt with questions regarding the acquisition of the Soviet citizenship, its forfeiting or voluntary rejection.

When the Supreme Soviet was not in session, the Presidium carried out the Supreme Soviet's ordinary functions. It was also empowered to issue decrees in lieu of law, which were to be submitted to the Supreme Soviet at its next session. If such decrees were not ratified by the Supreme Soviet, they were to be considered revoked. In practice, the Supreme Soviet's infrequent sessions (it usually sat for only one week per year) and the principles of democratic centralism meant that Presidium decrees de facto had the force of law. It was not unheard of for the CPSU Politburo to bypass the full Supreme Soviet and enact major laws as Presidium decrees. While the Supreme Soviet's power of veto was almost never exercised in practice, it was not unheard of for the Politburo to enact Presidium decrees into law without even the formality of submitting them to the Supreme Soviet for ratification.

At abolition
According to the 1977 Constitution of the USSR, as in force at the union's dissolution (and thus, at the abolition of the Presidium), the basic powers of the Presidium of the Supreme Soviet of the USSR were:

 organization of the work of the Supreme Soviet;
 preparation of meetings of the Congress of People's Deputies and sessions of the Supreme Soviet;
 coordination of the work of the committees of the Supreme Soviet;
 organization of nationwide discussion of legislative bills and "other very important matters of state".

By then, most of the Presidium's former powers were reassigned to the whole Supreme Soviet and to the President of the USSR.

List of chairmen

List of vice chairmen

See also 
List of heads of state of the Soviet Union
General Secretary of the Communist Party of the Soviet Union
Presidium of the Supreme Soviet of the Russian Soviet Federative Socialist Republic
Presidium of the Supreme Soviet of the Ukrainian Soviet Socialist Republic

Notes

References

Further reading
 
 

 
1938 establishments in the Soviet Union
1991 disestablishments in the Soviet Union
Supreme Soviet of the Soviet Union
Soviet Union

bg:Председател на Президиума на Върховния съвет на СССР
ru:Председатель Президиума Верховного Совета СССР